For Ávila (XAV) is a regional political party in Castile and León, centered in the province of Ávila. It was formed as a split from the People's Party in January 2019 and officially registered as a political party on 18 February 2019.

Electoral performance

Ávila City Hall

Cortes of Castile and León

Cortes Generales

References

Centrist parties in Spain
Regionalist parties in Spain
Political parties established in 2019
2019 establishments in Castile and León
Political parties in Castile and León